Geoffrey Theodore Garratt MBE (1888 – 28 April 1942) was a British farmer, journalist and political activist.

Born in Oxfordshire, son of clergyman the Reverend Charles Francis Garratt and his wife Agnes Mary (nee Percival), Garratt was educated at Rugby School and then attended Hertford College, Oxford.  In 1912, he joined the Indian Civil Service, based in Bombay. During World War I he was placed in the Indian Army Reserve of Officers in 1915, and from 1916 was on active service with the 21st Cavalry, taking part in the Mesopotamian campaign.

After the end of the war, Garratt returned to the civil service, but he resigned in 1922, unhappy about the amount of money being spent on prestigious projects while poverty was widespread in the country.  He found work as the Berlin correspondent of the Westminster Gazette.

Garratt returned to the UK in 1923, settling in Cambridgeshire.  There, he took up farming, and also became politically active.  He joined the Independent Labour Party, and stood unsuccessfully for the Labour Party in Cambridgeshire at the 1924, 1929 and 1931 United Kingdom general elections, and then The Wrekin at the 1935 United Kingdom general election, and in the 1937 Plymouth Drake by-election.  In 1925, he was elected to Cambridgeshire County Council.  Although his farming was largely a hobby, he has been described as "almost... the party's official spokesman to the farming community".

In the 1930s, Garratt worked for the Manchester Guardian, covering Indian nationalism, the Second Italo-Ethiopian War, and the Winter War. From 1937 to 1938 he spent his time working in eastern Spain for Spanish Relief. Based on his experiences, he wrote Mussolini's Roman Empire in 1938, and also edited The Legacy of India.

During World War II, Garratt served in the Pioneer Corps with the rank of Major. He was placed in charge of a group of German volunteers doing war work for the British government.  On April 28, 1942, aged 53, he was killed along with 18 other men in an explosion at the Defensible Barracks overlooking Pembroke Dock. He is buried at Llanion Military Cemetery in the town. There is a plaque dedicated to him at the Imperial War Museum.

References

1888 births
1942 deaths
British Indian Army officers
Royal Pioneer Corps officers
Military personnel from Oxfordshire
Indian Army personnel of World War I
British military personnel of World War II
Deaths by airstrike during World War II
English journalists
Independent Labour Party politicians
Indian Civil Service (British India) officers
Members of Cambridgeshire County Council
Labour Party (UK) councillors
Labour Party (UK) parliamentary candidates
People from Oxfordshire
People educated at Rugby School
Alumni of Hertford College, Oxford